Priyadarshi Pulikonda (born 25 August 1989) is an Indian actor and comedian who works in Telugu films. He gained recognition for his role in Pelli Choopulu (2016). In addition to supporting roles, Priyadarshi played the lead in films such as Mallesham (2019), Mithai (2019), and Mail (2021). His performance in Mallesham (2019) appeared in the "100 Greatest Performances of the Decade" by Film Companion.

Early life
Priyadarshi was born on 26 August 1989 in a Telugu-speaking Telugu family in Telangana, India. His father Pulikonda Subbachary is a professor and his mother's name is Jayalakshmi. Priyadarshi's parents shifted to Hyderabad when he was 2 years old since then they have been living in Hyderabad. They lived in the Old City until he was 10, later moved to Gachibowli and now lives in Chandanagar. He did his Bachelor of Science in Statistics from MNR Degree & PG College and has a postgraduate degree in Mass Communication from the University of Hyderabad.

Personal life
Priyadarshi married writer Richa Sharma in 2018, who was his senior at the University of Hyderabad.

Career 
Priyadarshi played the role of a terrorist in the 2016 film Terror, which was met with critical acclaim. However, his rise was through the character of Kaushik in the successful 2016 romantic comedy Pelli Choopulu. The film was praised for story line, performances and clean humour. Priyadarshi was praised for pulling off the Telangana Baasha with ease. He has acted in a web series Loser, where he played the role of a rifle shooter. His performance was appreciated by critics.

In an interview with The Hindu, he said he was inspired to become an actor after watching Sagara Sangamam, calling it a "paradigm shift". He is a fan of actors Kamal Haasan and Chiranjeevi, and directors K. Balachander, K. Viswanath, and Singeetam Srinivasa Rao.

Besides working in several short films, he has appeared in Jai Lava Kusa, which stars NTR Jr., Nivetha Thomas and Raashi Khanna. He also appeared in the Mahesh Babu starrer Spyder, directed by AR Murugadoss.

Filmography

Film

Acting roles

Voice artist
Gang (D) for RJ Balaji
Frozen 2 (D) for Olaf

Television

Awards and nominations

References

External links
 
 

Living people
Telugu male actors
Telugu comedians
1989 births
Indian male film actors
Male actors in Telugu cinema
Indian male comedians
Male actors from Telangana
People from Khammam
Zee Cine Awards Telugu winners